Syaifullah Nazar (born May 15, 1983) is an Indonesian former footballer who played as a forward. He was one of the original players in South Kalimantan.

Honours

Club honors
Barito Putera
Liga Indonesia Premier Division (1): 2011–12
Liga Indonesia Second Division (1): 2008–09

Individual honors
 Liga Indonesia First Division Top Scorer (1): 2009–10

References

External links

1983 births
Association football forwards
Living people
Indonesian footballers
Liga 1 (Indonesia) players
PS Barito Putera players
Indonesian Premier Division players
Sportspeople from South Kalimantan